Agustín Francisco Carbó Lugo (born February 27, 1970) is an energy and environmental lawyer and the President & CEO of ClimaTHINK Institute for Climate Law & Policy.

Education
He holds a Bachelor of Science and Master of Science degree in civil and environmental engineering from Northeastern University, a juris doctor from Vermont Law School, and a master of environmental management from Yale University. Carbó is also a member of the Phi Sigma Alpha fraternity.

Career
He served as the first chairman of the Puerto Rico Energy Commission (PREC)  and the executive director of the Puerto Rico Solid Waste Authority under the administration of governor Alejandro García Padilla. He was an Assistant Regional Counsel for the United States Environmental Protection Agency.

Notes

References

External links
Archived Bio from the Puerto Rico Energy Commission's Website

1970 births
Yale School of Forestry & Environmental Studies alumni
Puerto Rican lawyers
People from Mayagüez, Puerto Rico
People of the United States Environmental Protection Agency
Vermont Law and Graduate School alumni
Northeastern University alumni
Living people
American chief executives